Ramniklal Chhanganlal Solanki  (1931 – 1 March 2020) was an Indian-British journalist and newspaper editor.
 He moved to the United Kingdom in 1964.

Honours, decorations, awards and distinctions
Awarded OBE "For services to Publishing and to the Asian Community." New Year's Honours, 31 December 1998
Awarded CBE "For services to Publishing and to Community Relations." New Year Honours, 30 December 2006

References

1931 births
2020 deaths
British journalists
Indian journalists
Indian emigrants to the United Kingdom
Commanders of the Order of the British Empire